These lists of Claremont Colleges people include notable graduates, non-graduating attendees, and past and present faculty, staff, and administrators of the Claremont Colleges (7Cs), a consortium of seven highly selective private institutions of higher education located in Claremont, California, United States. They are divided into articles by college:

List of Pomona College people
List of Claremont Graduate University people
List of Scripps College people
List of Claremont McKenna College people
List of Harvey Mudd College people
List of Pitzer College people
List of Keck Graduate Institute people

See also

 People
Claremont